The 1992–93 National Professional Soccer League season was the ninth season for the league. Also this was the first year for the NPSL being the top level of professional indoor soccer.

League Standings

American Division

National Division

Playoffs

League Leaders

Scoring

Goalkeeping

League awards
 Most Valuable Player: Hector Marinaro, Cleveland
 Defender of the Year: Kim Røntved, Wichita
 Rookie of the Year: Brett Phillips, Harrisburg
 Goalkeeper of the Year: Cris Vaccaro, Baltimore
 Coach of the Year: Zoran Savic, Kansas City

All-NPSL Teams

All-Rookie Teams

External links
Major Indoor Soccer League II (RSSSF)
1993 in American Soccer

1992 in American soccer leagues
1993 in American soccer leagues
1992-93